Benjamin Buchanan (born August 21, 2001) is an American professional wrestler. He is currently signed to WWE where he performs on the NXT brand under the ring name Brooks Jensen. In WWE, he is a one-time NXT UK Tag Team Champion with Josh Briggs, and he and Briggs are recognized as the final holders of the championship.

Buchanan is a second generation wrestler and is the son of Bull Buchanan, who wrestled with the World Wrestling Federation / World Wrestling Entertainment from 1997 until 2003.

Early life 
Buchanan was born in 2001 in Ranburne, Alabama and is the son of former WWE superstar Barry Buchanan who wrestled in the WWE from 1997–2003 under the ring names Bull Buchanan and B².

Professional wrestling career 
Buchanan debuted on March 2, 2019. He went on to work throughout the southern wrestling territories, mostly appearing in promotions in Alabama and Georgia. He became a one-time Heavyweight Champion and a multiple-time Tag Team Champion between 2020 and 2021.

It was announced on August 30, 2021, Buchanan was one of six athletes signed to report to the WWE Performance Center. He made his in ring debut on the September 14 episode of NXT 2.0 as Brooks Jensen teaming with fellow NXT rookie Josh Briggs in a tag match against Imperium (Marcel Barthel and Fabian Aichner). They would work as a tag team during the following month, participating in the 2022 Dusty Rhodes Tag Team Classic tournament and had two matches for the NXT Tag Team Championship, but they didn't win the tournament nor the titles. On June 22 taping of NXT UK, they would make their debut in the UK brand in a fatal four-way elimination match to win the vacant NXT UK Tag Team Championship, making them the first and only non-European tag team to win the titles, as well as the first ever male superstar born in the 2000s to win a championship in WWE.

Championships and accomplishments 
Anarchy Wrestling
Anarchy Tag Team Championship (1 time) – with Bull Buchanan
Southern Fried Championship Wrestling
SFCW Tag Team Championship (1 time) – with Bull Buchanan
Victory Championship Wrestling
VCW Heavyweight Championship (1 time)
WWE
NXT UK Tag Team Championship (1 time, final) – with Josh Briggs

References

External links
 
 
 
 

2001 births
21st-century professional wrestlers
American male professional wrestlers
American male sport wrestlers
Living people
NXT UK Tag Team Champions
Professional wrestlers from Alabama
People from Alabama
Sportspeople from Alabama